DMSP may refer to:

 Defense Meteorological Satellite Program, a United States Department of Defense satellite system
 Dimethylsulfoniopropionate, an important component of the organic sulfur cycle